"Chemistry" is a song by Australian rock band Mondo Rock, released in July 1981 as the third single from the band's second studio album Chemistry (1981). The song peaked at number 20 on the Kent Music Report.

Track listing 
AUS 7" Single

Charts

Personnel 
 Ross Wilson – vocals, guitar, harmonica (1976–1991)
 John James Hackett – drums, percussion, guitar (1981–1990)
 James Gillard – bass guitar (1982–1990)
 James Black – keyboards (1980–1984)
 Eric McCusker – guitar, keyboards (1980–1991)
 Paul Christie – bass guitar (1980–1982)

References 

Mondo Rock songs
1981 songs
1981 singles
Songs written by Paul Christie (musician)